Boris and Natasha: The Movie is a 1992 American comedy television film that was loosely based on the animated television series The Rocky and Bullwinkle Show. Although Rocky and Bullwinkle do not appear in this film, they are referenced when two minor characters are revealed to be known also as "Agents Moose and Squirrel" during a climactic scene. This was due to the production company's inability to secure the rights to the animated characters' likenesses for this film. Originally intended for a theatrical release, this film was produced by Management Company Entertainment Group for Showtime Networks, and aired on Showtime on April 17, 1992.

Plot

The movie opens in the tiny country of Pottsylvania, where Fearless Leader concocts a plan to obtain a time-reversal microchip, invented by Professor Anton Paulovitch. He asks his top agent, Agent X, to find the professor, but Agent X suggests they send some patsies instead. Boris Badenov and Natasha Fatale accept the assignment and are told to defect to America. After a number of failed attempts, they arrive in America. The head of the CIA, Sheldon Kaufman, decides to have tests run on them to see if they are truly defecting. After the test, it's obvious to everyone that they should be deported, but a worker, Willie, points out they hadn't had any defections in a while, and thinks they should play along and spy on them in the meantime to see what they are after.

Boris and Natasha are given an apartment and money, while being secretly watched by Agent X, who himself is being followed by a mysterious figure. The duo have to meet with a secret assassin named Kalishak, who supposedly knows who they should seek, but first have to deal with their next-door neighbors, Toots and Harve, who are very interested in knowing about them. Toots assumes Boris and Natasha are a couple, and when Natasha denies it, Toots figures she's wrong. Natasha, who has become fascinated with America, also learns from Toots that American couples usually help each other, something Boris and Natasha do not.

They find Kalishak, who denies that he knows anything about the professor. After accepting a bribe, Kalishak acts as a shoe-shine boy and tells Boris "Search your sole," which Boris doesn't understand. After they leave, one of Kalishak's potatoes is replaced with a bomb, killing him. Natasha later sees information written on the sole of Boris' shoe, telling them to find "Minelli". Disguised as rug cleaners, they go to the location on the shoe, where they learn that the "Minelli" they're looking for is Sal Minelli, a photographer. Natasha then gets an offer for a photo shoot and a party, which Boris figures will be a good opportunity to meet Minelli. To pass the time before the party they go shopping at a mall, but the next day Natasha returns, going shopping with Toots, behind Boris' back. She learns that Toots doesn't need Harve's permission to do things, and learns more about their married life. Boris says a code phrase to many photographers, to no avail, before not being allowed in, but Natasha soon hits celebrity status.

Boris gets annoyed at Natasha for acting like such a celebrity, especially since Fearless Leader had ordered them to keep a low profile. But Natasha remembers what Toots had told her, and points out that she's been responsible for Boris' success before leaving for the party. Boris starts to feel bad about their argument, while at the party Natasha keeps seeing Boris. She leaves the party, and finds Boris sleeping outside.

Minelli calls their home and arranges a photo session with Natasha. It turns out Minelli is a spy, and they are being spied on by Kaufman, Agent X, and the man who had been following Agent X. He informs her that Fearless Leader had sent them as patsies and that they'll be killed when they find the professor. Just when he's about to tell her the name of Agent X, Agent X kills Minelli. Boris, disguised as a cop, finds out that Agent X is actually Willie. Boris and Natasha leave their apartment right as an assassination attempt on them occurs. Disguised as overweight Irishmen, they stay at a hotel, where they find Willie dead, and also find that he had an 11:30 train schedule. They leave with Willie, intent on hiding his body, but they encounter Harve and Toots attending a party at the hotel, and convince them Willie has had too many drinks. Boris and Natasha eventually send Willie's body down a laundry chute, only to remember that they had left the train schedule at the hotel room. When they get back, they see Paulovitch, who's revealed to be the one who'd been following Agent X. He asks that they discuss the chip, which Boris and Natasha still know nothing about, but Toots and Harve suddenly arrive with Willie's body, which they decided to return him to them. When questioned about being at a hotel when they have an apartment, they claim that they are there for relationship counseling. Once Toots and Harve are gone, they find Paulovitch missing, along with the train schedule.

They chase after Paulovitch, eventually catching a taxi, where they see Paulovitch and question him, who claims he doesn't know what they are talking about. Boris then discovers lit dynamite in the taxi, and that the driver is actually a dummy. The car explodes, but the explosion reverses. After a few explosions and reverses, they jump out of the taxi. Paulovitch tells them about the time-reversing chip and reveals that that was his first life-and-death experiment with it. He explains that his evil twin brother Kreeger is also after the chip. Boris and Natasha decide to help make sure it doesn't fall into the wrong hands. However, Paulovitch gets kidnapped, but Boris and Natasha find a penny, which they instantly see as a clue. They go to Mount Rushmore, where they notice a ladder going into Lincoln's nose.

There, they find Paulovitch's secret laboratory. They discover millions of time-reverse microchips, and find Anton tied up. He tells them he was kidnapped by Kreeger, but then they learn that he is in fact Kreeger, while Anton is free. They learn that once Anton realized the microchip could be disastrous in the wrong hands, he tried to destroy it, only for its effect to protect it from destruction, so he had them mass-produced with the intention of sending them to every country with the goal of ending wars. Kaufman enters and reveals that he's not actually working for the government, but the auto industry and insurance companies, and knows that the chip could put an end to his business. Harve and Toots then show up with guns, and reveal themselves to be Agents Moose and Squirrel. Fearless Leader shows up and takes over, taking the pile of microchips. After Natasha manages to temporarily disable the power, a fight ensues. Boris takes out a stick of dynamite, which he was "saving for a rainy day", and throws it at the pile of microchips, which sends them back to the very beginning of the movie. Knowing what will happen, Boris realizes that Fearless Leader must know what will happen as well, so Boris decides they will go to Tahiti (a place Natasha had earlier expressed desire to visit) instead. When Paulovitch realizes that he hadn't been properly introduced to them, Boris introduces Natasha as his girlfriend.

The narrator wonders aloud if they really are safe from the danger they had avoided by going to Tahiti, asking all kinds of questions, before Boris tells him to shut up. The narrator then tells viewers to tune in to their next episode, "'Goodbye Mr. Chip', or 'The Megabytes Back!'"

Home media
The film was released on VHS in December 1992 by Academy Entertainment and on DVD from Platinum Disc in 1999. The DVD contained no bonus material. MGM later re-released it on DVD on June 26, 2012, as part of their "Limited Edition Collection".

Cast

June Foray, the original voice of Natasha and Rocky from the Rocky and Bullwinkle Show, makes a cameo appearance as a woman who wants Natasha's autograph.

References

External links
 
 

1992 television films
1992 films
1992 comedy films
1990s American films
1990s English-language films
American comedy television films
Films directed by Charles Martin Smith
Films scored by David Kitay
Films shot in Los Angeles
Live-action films based on animated series
Metro-Goldwyn-Mayer films
Showtime (TV network) films
The Adventures of Rocky and Bullwinkle and Friends